2-(Trimethylsilyl)ethoxymethyl chloride (SEM-Cl) is an organochlorine compound with the formula C6H15ClOSi, which was developed by Bruce H. Lipshutz during his work on the synthesis of N-methylmaysenine. It is used to protect hydroxyl group, which can be cleaved with fluoride in organic solvents selectively under mild conditions. Typically tetrabutylammonium fluoride and caesium fluoride can be used as deprotection reagents. Alternatives such as magnesium bromide, lithium tetrafluoroborate and boron trifluoride etherate were also developed to deprotect SEM group.

References

Further reading
 

Organochlorides
Trimethylsilyl compounds